Maya Tahan (born 9 January 1999) is an inactive Israeli tennis player. She has been ranked as high as No. 578 in singles by the Women's Tennis Association (WTA) in September 2019. Her career-high WTA doubles ranking is 456 which she achieved October 2019.

Early life and education
Tahan is from Tel Mond, Israel, to a family of Sephardic Jewish descent. Her parents are Gil and Merav Tahan. Her father is a colonel in the Israel Defense Forces (IDF), and her mother is a financial officer. She has an older sister, Roni, and two younger sisters, Dana and Shira.

Tennis career
Tahan began playing tennis at the age of eight and moved to train at the Netanya Tennis Club when she was 11 years old. She attended Rabin High School. She served in the Israel Defense Forces for two years. In December 2017, she won the Israel national doubles championship title partnering with Vlada Ekshibarova.

Tahan won two $15k singles tournaments in 2018, and $10k doubles events, and won a $25k doubles tournament in August 2019.

She played collegiate tennis for the Miami Hurricanes at the University of Miami in 2019-20, but had her spring season cut short by the COVID-19 pandemic in the United States. She recorded 7–4 in singles, and 2–6 in doubles.

Tahan also has represented Israel in Fed Cup in 2016, 2017, and 2019, and has a win–loss record of 2–5.

ITF Circuit finals

Singles (2–0)

Doubles (10–5)

See also
List of Jews in sports#Tennis

References

External links
 
 
 
 

1999 births
Living people
Israeli female tennis players
People from Tel Mond
Israeli Sephardi Jews
Israeli Mizrahi Jews
Miami Hurricanes women's tennis players
21st-century Israeli women